Freak Recordings is a UK-based drum n bass record label, owned and run by Dylan Hisley, which deals predominantly in heavier subgenres of drum and bass. It is affiliated with labels Obscene Recordings and Tech Itch Recordings, with the latter of whom it has formed a sub-label, Tech Freak Recordings, dedicated to the release of full-length albums. Artists include Dylan, Robyn Chaos, Audio, Limewax, Current Value, Counterstrike, Technical Itch, SPL, Basic Operations, Zardonic, Hedj, Forbidden Society, Kitech, Kantyze, and many more. Freak Recordings is also the co-founding company behind Therapy Sessions drum and bass festivals.

See also 
 List of record labels
 List of jungle and drum n bass record labels

References

External links
 Freak Discography

British record labels
Drum and bass record labels